The 1925–26 Illinois Fighting Illini men's basketball team represented the University of Illinois.

Regular season
Craig Ruby began the 1925–26 season with a Fighting Illini team had eight returning letterman from a team that placed in a tie for third place a year earlier. This team finished in a tie for fifth place in the Big Ten. Probably the greatest change for the Illini during this season was the opening of their new home, Huff Gymnasium. Originally named New Gymnasium, Huff Gymnasium was renamed in 1937 after George Huff, who was the school's athletic director from 1895 to 1935, Huff Gymnasium was home to the Fighting Illini's men's basketball program until 1963. The starting lineup included captain Leonard Haines and Kenneth Reynolds at guard, John Mauer at center and Jack Lipe, Russell Daugherity and Hollie Martin at forward.

Roster

Source

Schedule
												
Source																

|-	
!colspan=12 style="background:#DF4E38; color:white;"| Non-Conference regular season
|- align="center" bgcolor=""

			

|-	
!colspan=9 style="background:#DF4E38; color:#FFFFFF;"|Big Ten regular season

Bold Italic connotes conference game

Awards and honors

References

Illinois Fighting Illini
Illinois Fighting Illini men's basketball seasons
Illinois Fighting Illini men's basketball
Illinois Fighting Illini men's basketball